Helicopsis is a genus of air-breathing land snails, terrestrial pulmonate gastropod mollusks in the subfamily Helicellinae  of the family Geomitridae.

Distribution 
Distribution of the genus Helicopsis range Central and Eastern Europe to Iran.

Species
The species composition of Helicopsis was largely reviewed after revisions with methods of molecular taxonomy, many of the previously recognized species were shown to be conspecific and many other to be not related with true Helicopsis. After these revisions only 9 or 10 species can be placed into Helicopsis:

 Helicopsis aelleni Hausdorf, 1996 - Northern Iran
 Helicopsis anflousiana (Pallary, 1913)
 Helicopsis austriaca Gittenberger, 1969 - Austria
 Helicopsis buslimiana (Pollonera in Kobelt, 1898)  - Libya
 Helicopsis carrossei (Pallary, 1936)
 Helicopsis cereoflava (Bielz, 1851) - Romania, probably a synonym of Helicopsis lunulata
 Helicopsis cypriola (Westerlund, 1889)
 Helicopsis dejecta (Jan, 1832)  - Azov Sea
 Helicopsis filimargo (Krynicki, 1833) - Southern and Eastern Ukraine, adjacent regions of Russia, extremely variable, previously treated as several species
 Helicopsis gittenbergeri Hausdorf, 1990 - Greece
 Helicopsis hungarica (Soós & H. Wagner, 1935) - Central Europe and isolated locality in Russia
 Helicopsis larbiana (Pallary, 1928)
 Helicopsis likharevi Schileyko, 1978 - Kopet Dag in Turkmenistan
 Helicopsis lunulata (Krynicki, 1833) - Romania, Moldova, Ukraine, adjacent regions of Russia and probably Poland
 Helicopsis persica Hausdorf & Bössneck, 2016 - Northern Iran
 † Helicopsis phrygostriata (Oppenheim, 1919) 
 † Helicopsis piedmontanica Harzhauser, Neubauer & Esu in Harzhauser et al., 2015 
 † Helicopsis praecursor (Wenz, 1927) 
 Helicopsis striata (O. F. Müller, 1774) - type species, distributed only in Central Europe
 Helicopsis subcalcarata (Nägele, 1903)
 † Helicopsis suevica Gottschick & Wenz, 1927 
 Helicopsis teboudensis (Pallary, 1928)
 Helicopsis welschi (Pallary, 1899)
 † Helicopsis wenzi Schütt, 1985 

Synonyms that were recognized as species before 21st century:
 Helicopsis altenai Gasull, 1974 accepted as Xerotricha vatonniana (Bourguignat, 1867) (junior synonym)
 Helicopsis arenosa (Krynicki, 1836) accepted as Helicopsis filimargo arenosa (Krynicki, 1836) accepted as Helicopsis filimargo (Krynicki, 1833)
 Helicopsis dejecta (Rossmässler, 1838) - synonym of Helicopsis filimargo
 Helicopsis depulsa (Pintér, 1969): synonym of Xerolenta depulsa (L. Pintér, 1969) (taxon inquirendum)
 Helicopsis gigaxii Haas, 1924 is a synonym of Xerocrassa ripacurcica (Bofill, 1886)
 Helicopsis instabilis (Rossmässler, 1838) - synonym of Helicopsis lunulata
 Helicopsis leptocolpata (Pallary,1923): synonym of Xerosecta leptocolpata (P.M. Pallary, 1923) 
 Helicopsis luganica Gural-Sverlova, 2010 accepted as Helicopsis filimargo (Krynicki, 1833) (junior synonym)
 Helicopsis martynovi Gural-Sverlova, 2010 accepted as Helicopsis filimargo (Krynicki, 1833) (junior synonym)
 Helicopsis murcica (A. Schmidt, 1854) accepted as Xerocrassa subrogata (L. Pfeiffer, 1853) (invalid; based on a preoccupied original name)
 Helicopsis paulhessei (Lindholm, 1936) - synonym of Helicopsis filimargo
 Helicopsis retowskii (Clessin, 1883) - synonym of Helicopsis filimargo
 Helicopsis subfilimargo Gural-Sverlova, 2010 accepted as Helicopsis filimargo (Krynicki, 1833) (junior synonym)
 Helicopsis tabulae Chaper, 1855 accepted as Lyrocystis perplicata (Benson, 1851) (synonym)
 Helicopsis turcica (Holten, 1802): synonym of Xeroleuca turcica (Chemnitz, 1795)

Species and synonyms that were placed into Helicopsis, but are not:
 Helicopsis conopsis Morelet, 1876

References

Geomitridae
Gastropod genera
Taxonomy articles created by Polbot